WKIZ (1500 AM) was a radio station broadcasting a talk radio format. Licensed to Key West, Florida, United States, the station was last owned by Daniel Caamano, through licensee Almavision of Miami, brokered to KONK Communications.

History
WKIZ began broadcasting on March 27, 1959. It was owned by the Florida Keys Broadcasting Corporation.

In the early 1990s, the station aired an oldies format. It was taken off the air December 6, 1994, but resumed broadcasting in early 1997, as an affiliate of Bloomberg News. It adopted a Spanish language format later in the year. In the 2000s, the station aired a progressive talk format as an affiliate of Air America.

In 2010, Overseas Radio, LLC began brokering broadcasting time on WKIZ. The station was branded KONK and aired a talk radio format. The radio station was called "The Best Talk Radio Station in Florida" by Florida Monthly magazine (September 2010). KONK originally signed on May 26, 2009, as an unlicensed station operating under U.S. Federal Communications Commission (FCC) Part 15 low power rules, broadcasting on 1630 kHz at 1 milliwatt, covering only the island of Key West.

The station was taken off the air on September 10, 2017, due to damage to its transmitter, caused by Hurricane Irma. It resumed operations in September 2018, running reduced power of 62.5 watts, but was again taken silent on October 22, 2018. Its license expired on February 1, 2020, as its owner failed to file an application to renew the station's license.

References

External links
FCC Station Search Details: DWKIZ (Facility ID: 11193)
FCC History Cards for WKIZ (covering 1956-1980 as WFKB / WKIZ)

KIZ
Radio stations established in 1959
1959 establishments in Florida
Radio stations disestablished in 2020
2020 disestablishments in Florida
Defunct radio stations in the United States
KIZ